Wirta Pata (Aymara wirta vegetable garden (a borrowing from Spanish huerta), pata step, "vegetable garden step", also spelled Huerta Pata) is a mountain in the Andes of Peru and the name of a lake near the mountain. The mountain and the lake are  located in the Puno Region, Sandia Province, Limbani District. It lies north of the peaks of Ariquma and Ankayuq K'uchu, and southwest of the lakes Ch'uxñaquta ("green lake", Chocñecota) and Tinkiqucha (Tinquicocha).

References 

Mountains of Puno Region
Lakes of Puno Region
Mountains of Peru
Lakes of Peru